Administradora Coahuilense de Infraestructura y Transporte Aéreo (ACITA) is the operator of four airports in the State of Coahuila, Mexico.

Operating Airports

It is a company incorporated under SA with 51% by the Government of the State of Coahuila, and 49% ACITA (Administradora Coahuilense de Infraestructura y Transporte Aéreo).

Passenger's number
Number of passengers at each airport by 2021:

See also 

List of the busiest airports in Mexico

References

External links 
 Government of Coahuila State

Airport operators of Mexico
Airports in Mexico
Aviation in Mexico